Acraea ansorgei is a butterfly in the family Nymphalidae. It is found in Kenya, Uganda and the Democratic Republic of the Congo.

Description
 
A. conjuncta Sm. (ansorgei) has an expanse of only 46 mm. and the sexes are similarly marked and coloured. Wings above with blackish, beneath with dark grey ground-colour; the dark ochre-yellow hindmarginal spot is about 4 mm. in breadth, reaches vein 3 without completely covering the base of cellule 2, occasionally also forms a small spot at the base of cellule 3 and joins the spot in the cell, which, however, forms almost a right angle with the hindmarginal spot; the small subapical spots are also dark yellow; the hindwing is dark yellow, at the base and the inner and distal margins blackish; the marginal band about 3 mm. in breadth. The under surface is lighter, but otherwise little different. British East Africa. f. interrupta Eltr. has the 
median transverse band of the forewing broken up into separate spots.- female-ab. silacea Eltr. The light markings of the upper surface are light yellow. - female-ab. mutata Eltr. only differs from silacea in having the subapical spots of the forewing white.- female-ab. pica Eltr. has all the light markings white.- female-ab. lutealba Eltr. has the light spots of the forewing orange-yellow and the median band of the hindwing white.-female-ab. suffusa Eltr. is characterized by having the fore wing blackish only at the base and apex, otherwise suffused with orange-yellow; on the hindwing the marginal band is irrorated with yellow scales.-ansorgei. A. ansorgei Sm. [species in Seitz] The forewing marked almost exactly as in conjuncta ; the hindwing above unicolorous orange-yellow, beneath clearer yellow with a nebulous grey median band; the light markings are sometimes cream-yellow and the subapical dots of the fore wing white. Hitherto only females known. British East Africa.

Taxonomy
It is a member of the Acraea jodutta species group.-   but see also Pierre & Bernaud, 2014

References

External links

Images representing Acraea ansorgei at Bold

Butterflies described in 1898
ansorgei
Butterflies of Africa
Taxa named by Henley Grose-Smith